Wenceslao Roces Suárez (3 February 1897 – 29 March 1992) was a Spanish professor of Roman law, a prolific translator and undersecretary of the Ministry of Education and Fine Arts. He was a committed Marxist, and had to leave Spain after the Spanish Civil War (1936–39). While in exile he taught at the University of Santiago, the University of Havana and the National Autonomous University of Mexico. He returned to Spain and became a Senator for Asturias for a while before returning to Mexico, where he died.

Life

Wenceslao Roces Suárez was born on 3 February 1897 in Soto de Sobrescobio, Oviedo, Asturias. 
His parents were Lucas Roces and María Suárez.
He graduated in Law from the University of Oviedo and took his doctorate from the University of Madrid in 1922.
He then studied in Germany, and at the age of 26 was given the chair of Roman Law at the University of Salamanca.
There he taught historical legal studies until 1931.
He published several articles in the Revista de derecho privado of Madrid.

Roces married Carmen Dorronsoro, with whom he had two children.
He was drawn into the turbulent politics of Spain in the inter-war years, and became a militant activist in the Spanish Communist Party.
He would remain a committed Marxist until his death.
From 1936 to 1939 he was Undersecretary of the Ministry of Education and Fine Arts in the Republican government.
He also directed the Cénit and Logos publishing houses, and translated many works into Spanish from different languages, but mainly from German.
Wenceslao, together with the head of government the socialist Negrin, was one of the main responsible of the terrible looting committed during the three years of the Spanish red revolution period (Civil War), and take out from Spain to Mexico a huge amount of stolen money, thousand of works of arts, the entire numismatic collection and others.
Roces was forced to scape, leaving Spain after the end of the Spanish Civil War (1936–39).
He taught at the universities of Santiago, Chile and Havana, Cuba between 1940 and 1942.
He then moved to the National Autonomous University of Mexico intending to teach Roman Law at the Faculty of Law.
He chose to join the Faculty of Arts, where he was a full professor and taught Greek History, History of Rome, Historical Materialism & Ancient History and Marxist Philosophy.
After returning to Spain he was elected Senator, but resigned from that position due to disagreement with the direction of the Communist Party of Spain, and went back to Mexico.

Wenceslao Roces died in Mexico City on 29 March 1992 due to a myocardial infarction and is buried in the Pantheon Garden of Mexico, Federal District.

Publications

Roces published translations of work by a wide variety of authors including Ernst Bloch,  Fernand Braudel, Jacob Burckhardt, Ernst Cassirer, Victor Prosper Considerant, Heinrich August Aemilius Danz, Wilhelm Dilthey, Johann Gustav Droysen, Hermann Duncker, Friedrich Engels, Ernst Fischer, Hans Albrecht Fischer, Georg Friederici, Ludwig Friedländer, Oskar Georg Fischbach, Ernst Glaeser, Ferdinand Gregorovius, Eli Heckscher, Georg Wilhelm Friedrich Hegel, Johan Huizinga, Wilhelm von Humboldt, Werner Jaeger, Hans Kelsen, Theodor Kipp, F. V. Konstantinov, Alexandre Koyré, Paul Lafargue, Otto Lenel, Vladimir Lenin, Karl Marx, Gustav Mayer, Robert Von Mayr, Franz Mehring, Adolf Merkel, Theodor Mommsen, Paul Oertmann, Gustav Radbruch, Leopold von Ranke, Erich Maria Remarque, Erwin Rohde, Mark M. Rosental, Rudolph Sohm, Vladimir Gordeevich Sorin, Philipp Spitta, Joseph Stalin, Rudolf Stammler, Max Stainitzer, John Addington Symonds, Wilhelm Szilasi, Leon Trotsky, Andreas von Tuhr, Wilhelm Windelband, Clara Zetkin and Stefan Zweig.

His own writing includes:

References

Sources

1897 births
1992 deaths
Academic staff of the University of Santiago, Chile
Academic staff of the University of Salamanca
Academic staff of the National Autonomous University of Mexico
Academic staff of University of Havana